Kipper the Dog is a character in a series of books for preschool-age children by British writer Mick Inkpen. The books consist of 34 titles (as of July 2005), which have sold over 8 million copies and have been translated into over 20 languages. The books have also won many awards.

The characters in the Kipper the Dog book series also appear in the animated television series Kipper.

Characters
Kipper the Dog - The title character of the TV show and books. He is warm-hearted, friendly and curious. Kipper is not at all selfish, though he is known to be a hoarder. Kipper is likely portrayed after beagle, beagle mix or Jack Russell terrier breed.
Tiger - Kipper's best friend. He is more practical and wise than Kipper. Sometimes Tiger can be very smug and naughty, though he really is a kind dog at heart. Tiger is likely portrayed after Scottish Terrier or schnauzer breed.
Jake - A friendly, warm-hearted sheepdog who is one of Kipper's best friends. He is a minor character on Kipper. However, he, Kipper and Tiger have had many adventures together.
Holly - A cheery white dog with brown spots who is one of Kipper's friends.
Pig - Kipper's other best friend. Pig likes to eat chocolate cakes and cookies and at times can be misjudging.
Arnold - Pig's toddler cousin who is more aware than Pig and he usually says nothing, but at times he says simple words like "duck" and "igloo". Arnold has many exciting encounters while the older ones are occupied.
Mouse - A mouse who lives with Kipper at his house.
The Bleepers - A couple of space aliens and a robot who live on the Moon.

Books
Some of the books have been translated into other languages, including Spanish.

TV series

Kipper is a British animated children's television series based on the Kipper the Dog picture book series.

Awards
Winner of BAFTA for Preschool Animation in 1998, 2000 and 2001.
Publishers Weekly named Kipper as one of the Best Children's Books in 2001.
Annecy International Animated Film Festival '98 award, TV Series, Special Prize (up to 12 minutes).
Silver Pulcinella Award, 1999, Best Series for Infants
Dove Foundation, Dove Family-Approved Suitable for all ages. Tiger Tales and Pools, Parks and Picnics.

References

External links
 Mick Inkpen's official website

British picture books
Series of children's books
Children's books adapted into television shows
English-language books
Books about dogs
Books about pigs
Books about mice and rats
Children's books about friendship
Book series introduced in 1989